Riich was an upmarket marque of the Chinese automaker Chery. Its models included a microvan, large sedans (the G5 and slightly bigger G6) and supermini Riich M series, including a five-door hatchback (M1), a small sedan (M5) and a five-door crossover (X1). The marque was launched in March 2009. The brand experienced poor sales and in September 2012. Due to that, Chery announced that it would be discontinued. Sales of Riich vehicles ended in April 2013.

Previously Chery used the "Riich" name for a model of van (the Chery Riich) prior to the creation of the Riich sub-brand.

Products
The first Riich product to enter production was the G6, a medium-to-high end sedan solely developed by Chery and offered with a 3.0-litre V6 engine or a 2.0-litre turbocharged engine.

The Riich X1 mini SUV was launched in November 2009, and the G5 mid-size sedan in December 2009.
Products launched by Riich before the discontinuation of the brand are listed below:
Riich M1
Riich X1
Riich G3
Riich G5
Riich G6

Gallery

References

External links

Chery
Car manufacturers of China
Luxury motor vehicle manufacturers